American singer-songwriter Drake Bell has released six studio albums, three extended plays, one video album, eighteen singles (including two as a featured artist), five promotional singles, twelve music videos and other album appearances.
On September 27, 2005, Bell released his debut album Telegraph. The album includes 12 tracks. His song, "Found a Way"—featured as the theme song for Drake & Josh—is also included on the show's soundtrack. In 2006, Bell signed with Universal Motown. He released his first single, "I Know", on October 17, 2006. The video for "I Know" was filmed in October 2006. As of 2015, the music video for his single "I Know", has received over 10 million views. Bell's second album, It's Only Time, was released on December 5, 2006 and reached Number 81 on Billboard's 200, selling 23,000 copies its first week of release. It's Only Time has sold 178,000 copies as of 2012. Bell features in the Hawk Nelson song, "Bring 'Em Out", from the 2005 film, Yours, Mine and Ours, and on the special edition of Hawk Nelson Is My Friend. Hawk Nelson released that version and the original version on their 2005 EP of the same name. On October 16, 2007, the Radio Disney single edit version of his song "Makes Me Happy", was released on iTunes. Bell also features on Miranda Cosgrove's "Leave It All to Me" single and theme song to the television comedy iCarly. His single "Superhero! Song" was released on April 4, 2008, to promote his film, Superhero Movie, which was released a week prior. His first video album and DVD, entitled Drake Bell in Concert, was released on December 16, 2008. It peaked at number 81 in the Top 100 Mexican Albums Chart.

Bell's single, "Terrific", was released on June 14, 2011, and was also included on an EP titled A Reminder, released on June 28, 2011, also featuring the songs "You’re Not Thinking", "Big Shot" and "Speak My Mind". The EP was produced by John Fields, who previously worked with Rooney, Jimmy Eat World, Selena Gomez, the Jonas Brothers, and Bleu. Bell said he decided to release A Reminder because he hasn't put out new music in a few years and "a full album will probably not happen until next year." Bell's unreleased songs with Daniella Monet, "Lookin' Like Magic" and "Wishful Thinking", appear in the films A Fairly Odd Movie: Grow Up, Timmy Turner! and its sequel, A Fairly Odd Christmas. Bell's holiday single, "Christmas Promise", was released on December 17, 2013. Bell's third album, Ready Steady Go! was released on April 22, 2014 and is his first album released under the record label Surfdog Records. Bell's single "Bitchcraft", was remixed by Caravan Palace. The remix was released as a single in 2014. Bell's song "Bull" peaked at number 8 on the Exametro Top Ten De Musica chart, which charts songs in the top ten in Mexico. "Bull" appears in the trailer for the animated film Birds of Paradise, which he also stars in. Bell's unreleased songs, "What You Need" and "Solo Flight", appear in the film, Wings: Sky Force Heroes.

As of 2011, Bell has sold over 1 million singles in the United States.

Albums

Studio albums

Soundtrack albums

Extended plays

Singles

As lead artist

As featuring artist

Promotional singles

Other appearances

Videography

Video albums

Music videos

Footnotes

References

Discography
Discographies of American artists
Pop music discographies
Rock music discographies